This is a list of New Zealand women's international footballers – association football players who have played for the New Zealand women's national football team in officially recognised international matches. All players with official senior caps are listed here.

Key

List of players
This table takes into account all New Zealand women's official international matches played up to and including 3 June 2019.

See also
List of New Zealand international footballers

References

Notes

External links
New Zealand Football Senior Women
FIFA page on New Zealand

 
New Zealand
Players
Football
international footballers
Association football player non-biographical articles